Tudelilla is a village in the province and autonomous community of La Rioja, Spain.

References

External links
Village website (Spanish)

Populated places in La Rioja (Spain)